Provanna admetoides is a species of sea snail, a marine gastropod mollusk in the family Provannidae.

Distribution
This species occurs in the Gulf of Mexico off Florida.

Description 
The maximum recorded shell length is 7.9 mm.

Habitat 
Minimum recorded depth is 630 m. Maximum recorded depth is 630 m.

References

 Rosenberg, G., F. Moretzsohn, and E. F. García. 2009. Gastropoda (Mollusca) of the Gulf of Mexico, Pp. 579–699 in Felder, D.L. and D.K. Camp (eds.), Gulf of Mexico–Origins, Waters, and Biota. Biodiversity. Texas A&M Press, College Station, Texas.

admetoides
Gastropods described in 1991